Kebri dehar  is a city in the eastern part of Ethiopia known as the Somali Region. Kebri Dehar is served by Kebri Dehar Airport  (ICAO code HAKD, IATA: ABK).

Located in the city are Kabri Dehar University, Kebri Dehar Health-science college, Kebri Dehar teacher Training college, Kebri Dehar polytechnic college, and other institutions such as hospitals, Ethiopian pharmacuatical agency.

History 
The earliest mention of Kebri Dehar in the Ogaden is in 1931, when it was described as "a soldier's camp" that suffered from malaria; although the settlement was 500 meters above the river, the scrub had not been cleared and provided the mosquitoes sufficient cover to reach their victims. According to Margery Perham, prior to the Italo-Abyssinian War, the Italians established a garrison at Kebri Dehar.

A Hospital for the town was under construction in 1958, when Emperor Haile Selassie inspected it during a tour of the Ogaden. In 1966 a road was built connecting Kebri Dehar and the new town of Gode. The Ethiopian Road Authority announced a construction project to connect Kebri Dehar with neighbouring towns. One road, to include 113.5 kilometres of paved road and five bridges will connect Kebri Dehar with Shekosh, while a second, which will include the creation of 95 kilometres of paved road and construction of six large and medium bridges, will connect the town to Danan.

During the Ogaden War in 1977, Kebri Dehar was defended by the Ethiopian Ninth Brigade against the Somali Army before abandoning it in disarray after being defeated by the Somali army who captured the town thereafter. It was recaptured by the Ethiopian Third Paracommando Brigade 8 March 1980.

Demographics 
Based on figures from the Central Statistical Agency in 2005, Kebri Dahar has an estimated total population of 100,191 of whom 51,327 are men and 48,864 are women. The 1997 census reported this town had a total population of 24,263 of whom 12,768 were men and 11,495 women. The two largest ethnic groups reported in this town were the Somali (99%), and the (1%); all other ethnic groups made up 0.3% of the population. 
It is the largest settlement in Kebri Dehar woreda.

Notes 

Populated places in the Somali Region